Mie Sedaap is an instant noodle brand produced by Wings Food. This instant noodle product was launched in 2003 and is currently the second most popular instant noodle in Indonesia. This product is claimed to be the only instant noodle on the market that has an ISO 22000 certificate. However, in Oct 2022, four Mi Sedaap products were recalled by Singapore Food Agency due to the detection of pesticide (Ethylene oxide) in the instant noodles.

Variety of flavors 

 Mie Sedaap Goreng (since 2003)
 Goreng
 Krispi
 Mi Ayam Istimewa
 Sambal Goreng

 Mie Sedaap Kuah (since 2003)
 Ayam Bawang
 Ayam Bawang Telur
 Ayam Spesial
 Baso Spesial
 Kari Ayam
 Kari Spesial
 White Curry
 Soto 
 Kaldu Ayam (no longer circulating)

 Mie Sedaap Cup (since 2013)
 Goreng
 Ayam Bawang Telur
 Baso Spesial
 Kari Spesial
 Soto 
 Selection Korean Spicy Chicken
 Selection Korean Spicy Soup
 Rawit Bingit Ayam Jerit
 Rawit Bingit Baso Bleduk

 Mie Sedaap Tasty (since 2018)
 Bakmi Ayam Daging Ayam Asli
 Ayam Geprek Matah
 Beef Yakiniku

 Mie Sedaap Selection (since 2019)
 Korean Cheese Buldak
 Korean Spicy Chicken
 Korean Spicy Soup 
 Singapore Spicy Laksa

 Mie Sedaap Nikmat HQQ (since 2020)
 Goreng Salero Padang
 Goreng Ayam Bakar Limau
 Soto Madura

See also 

 Indomie
 Pop Mie
 Sarimi

References

External links 

 Mie Sedaap on the official website of Wings Indonesia 

Instant noodle brands
Indonesian brands
Food and drink introduced in 2003